Budzów may refer to the following places in Poland:
Budzów, Lower Silesian Voivodeship (south-west Poland)
Budzów, Łódź Voivodeship (central Poland)
Budzów, Lesser Poland Voivodeship (south Poland)
Budzów, Opole Voivodeship (south-west Poland)